George Royal Davis (January 3, 1840 – November 25, 1899) was a U.S. Representative from Illinois.

Early life and education
George R. Davis was born in Palmer, Massachusetts on January 3, 1840. He completed classical studies at Williston Seminary, Easthampton, Massachusetts, and was graduated in 1860. Afterwards he studied law.

He married Gertrude Schulin on July 25, 1867.

Civil War military service
Davis entered the Union Army in July 1862 and served as captain in the Eighth Regiment, Massachusetts Volunteer Infantry, and as major in the Third Regiment, Rhode Island Volunteer Cavalry.

Career

Early career
Following the war Davis engaged in manufacturing, the insurance business, and as financial agent at Chicago, Illinois.

Military career
Davis later served as member of the State militia and senior colonel of the First Regiment, Illinois National Guard.

Political career
Davis was elected as a Republican to the 46th, 47th, and 48th Congresses (March 4, 1879 – March 4, 1885). He was not a candidate for renomination in 1884.

Business career
Davis chose to end his political career and resume his former business pursuits. He served as treasurer of Cook County, Illinois from 1886 to 1890. He served as director general of the World's Columbian Exposition at Chicago in 1893.

Death
Davis died at his home in Chicago on November 25, 1899, and was interred in Rosehill Cemetery.

See also

References

 Retrieved on 2008-10-13

External links
 
 

1840 births
1899 deaths
People from Palmer, Massachusetts
Republican Party members of the United States House of Representatives from Illinois
Politicians from Chicago
Union Army colonels
United States Army officers
Williston Northampton School alumni
Burials at Rosehill Cemetery
19th-century American politicians
Military personnel from Illinois
Military personnel from Massachusetts